Metaxmeste phrygialis is a species of moth of the family Crambidae described by Jacob Hübner in 1976. It is found in mountainous areas of Europe, including the Alps.

The wingspan is about 15 mm. The moth flies from June to August depending on the location.

External links
 UKMoths
 Swedish Moths

Odontiini
Moths of Europe
Moths described in 1796